The PL-4 was an air-to-air missile (AAM) developed by the People's Republic of China. It was designed by the 612 Research Institute and the Zhuzhou Aeroengine factory. The first version, the PL-4A, was China's first semi-active radar homing (SARH) AAM. It was developed into the infrared homing PL-4B.

The development program started in March 1966. The design may have been influenced by American AIM-7D Sparrow wreckage from the Vietnam War. Prototype ground-testing to the original 1960s requirements was completed in November 1980, with the second phase of development starting in July 1981. The program was cancelled in 1984 due to obsolescence and, with the normalization of relations with the United States - the availability of modern Western weapons.

The PL-4 was intended to arm the Chengdu J-9 - which was cancelled in 1980 - and then the Shenyang J-8II. Issues with the J-8II's Type 208 radar limited SARH performance, and the missile's cancellation severely affected the aircraft's development.

Variants
PL-4A
SARH version
PL-4B
IRH version

References

Citations

Bibliography

Guided missiles of the People's Republic of China
Air-to-air missiles of the People's Republic of China
Weapons of the People's Republic of China
Air-to-surface missiles of the Cold War